The Deanna Laney murders were those committed by Deanna Laney of her two oldest sons, 8-year-old Joshua and 6-year-old Luke, by stoning. In a 2004 trial, she was found not guilty by reason of insanity.

Details 
At roughly 11:30 pm on May 9, 2003, Laney woke and took Joshua, 8, to the yard of her home in New Chapel Hill, Texas where she lifted a large rock over her head and brought it down against his skull, fatally wounding him. She then dragged her 6-year-old son, Luke, to the same area, and killed him in the same manner.  At some point afterwards, she attempted to kill her youngest son, 14-month-old Aaron, in his crib with a stone. He was found alive with a pillow placed over his face, but suffered severe head injuries.

During the investigation, Laney claimed God ordered her to bash in her sons' heads. She was a member of an Assemblies of God church, where she sang in the choir.  A year earlier, she had told her fellow churchgoers that the world was coming to an end and that God had told her to get her house in order. Later on, she told a psychiatrist that she hoped she and Andrea Yates would end up working together as God's only witnesses at the end of the world.

Five mental health experts were consulted in Laney's case: two each by the prosecution and defense, and one by the judge. All of them arrived at the conclusion that she had psychotic delusions which made her unable to know right from wrong at the time of the killings.  A Smith County court found her not guilty by reason of insanity. She was committed to Kerrville State Hospital for eight years until her release in May 2012. However, she is subject to a list of conditions, including that she have no unsupervised contact with minors and submit to regular drug tests to ensure that she takes required medication.

See also
Other cases of filicide in Texas:
 John Battaglia
 Darlie Routier
 Andrea Yates
 Yaser Abdel Said

References 

 The Dallas Observer. "Psycho Mom," January 20, 2005. Retrieved on May 29, 2007.
  USA Today.  "Texas woman who killed kids acquitted," April 4, 2004.  Retrieved on May 30, 2007.
 05/24/2012 http://abclocal.go.com/ktrk/story?section=news/state&id=8676034

2003 in Texas
2003 murders in the United States
Child abuse resulting in death
Filicides in Texas